The Bundesvision Song Contest 2014 was the tenth edition of the annual Bundesvision Song Contest musical event. The contest was held on 20 September 2014 at the Lokhalle in Göttingen, Lower Saxony, following Bosse's win in the 2012 contest in Berlin with the song "So oder so". The contest was hosted by Stefan Raab, and Elton in the green room.

The winner of the Bundesvision Song Contest 2014 was Revolverheld with the song "Lass uns gehen", representing Bremen. In second place were Jupiter Jones representing Rhineland-Palatinate, and third place to Teesy representing Saxony-Anhalt.

Returning artist include: Jupiter Jones (2011), Revolverheld (2006), Andreas Bourani (2011), Marteria (2009), Flo Mega (2011), DCVDNS (2013; member of Inglebirds) and Philipp Breitenstein (2013 with Hannes Kinder & Band; member of Duerer).

Max Mutzke is the first artist to participate in the Eurovision Song Contest (2004) and then enter the Bundesvision Song Contest. This is the reverse of previous artists Sandy Mölling, and Nadja Benaissa who both participated as No Angels for Germany in the Eurovision Song Contest 2008, before entering the Bundesvision Song Contest.

7 of the 16 states awarded themselves the maximum of 12 points, with Baden-Württemberg, Bavaria, Berlin, Brandenburg, Hamburg, Hesse, Lower Saxony, North Rhine-Westphalia, and Saxony, awarding themselves 10, 10, 8, 7, 10, 10, 10, 10, and 10 points each respectively.

The contest was broadcast by ProSieben and watched by 1.44 million people, and was the highest rated competition since 2011.


Results

Scoreboard

References

External links
 Official BSC website at tvtotal.de

2014
Bundesvision Song Contest
2014 song contests